is a Shinto shrine in Setana, Hokkaidō, Japan. Founded in 1441–3, its buildings are scattered over the steep mountainside overlooking the Sea of Japan.

See also
 List of Shinto shrines in Hokkaidō

References

External links
 Photographs of Ōtasan Jinja

Shinto shrines in Hokkaido